Thomke is a surname. Notable people with the surname include:

 Ernst Thomke (born 1939), Swiss businessman
 Stefan Thomke, German-American economist

German-language surnames